The presence of a group of female disciples of Jesus at the crucifixion of Jesus is found in all four Gospels of the New Testament. There have been different interpretations how many and which women were present. Although some Christian traditions hold that there were Three Marys at the cross, only one gospel claims this, and these names differ from the other gospels.

Narrative comparison

Interpretations

Matthew and Mark, who speak of "many women" present at the crucifixion, mention three individually at the death of Jesus and two at his burial. Matthew describes the third individual present at the death as the mother of the sons of Zebedee, without naming her. Mark's third individual is called Salome. Luke mentions none individually. John mentions four individually, including Jesus' mother Mary, who is not mentioned by the other gospels.

The indication in  could be interpreted as referring to two, three or four women. There are difficulties against taking it as presenting a double apposition, with "his mother" being Mary of Clopas, and "his mother's sister" being Mary Magdalene. If the women are three, then there is a single apposition, with Mary of Clopas presented as the sister of Jesus' mother (despite the awkwardness of having two sisters bearing the same name) or else, since Hebrew and Aramaic had no specific word for "cousin", presented as her cousin or her sister-in-law, with Clopas considered the brother of Joseph. If there is no apposition, the women are four, as understood by Tatian and the Peshitta. If the last interpretation is chosen, the accounts that the four gospels give of individual women present at the crucifixion are:

Mary Magdalene is mentioned by all gospels apart from Luke, who mentions no individual. Mary, mother of James and Joseph/Joses is mentioned by Matthew and Mark. The others are mentioned by one gospel only: Mary, the mother of Jesus; Mary, the mother of the sons of Zebedee; Salome; a sister of Mary, mother of Jesus; Mary of Clopas. Attempts have been made to consider all these, except Mary, the mother of Jesus, as different designations of the same woman.

Thus Salome has been supposed to be the same as Mary of Clopas and to have been the mother of Zebedee's sons James and John, and a half-sister or sister-in-law of Mary the mother of Jesus.

See also 
 New Testament people named Mary
 The Three Marys

References

Followers of Jesus
Women in the New Testament
Crucifixion of Jesus
Bible-related lists of people
Crucifixion
The Three Marys
Articles about multiple people in the Bible